The Cave of the Silken Web is a 1967 film directed by Ho Meng Hua and produced by Shaw Brothers Studio in Hong Kong. The film is based on an episode from the 16th-century classic Chinese novel Journey to the West.

The film is the third of a series of four films based on Journey To The West. The others are Monkey Goes West (1966), Princess Iron Fan (1966) and The Land of Many Perfumes (1968).

Cast
 Tien Shun as Sha Wujing, Monk Sandy
 Pang Pang - Pigsy
 Liu Liang Hua as Elder Sister, Gold spider
 Angela Yu Chien as Third sister, 	Red Spider
 Shen Yi - Green spider
 Helen Ma - Purple spider
 Shirley Wong Sa-Lee - Brown spider
 Tien Meng - Silver spider
 Yau Ching - Blue spider
 Tang Ti - Centipede Goblin
 Shum Lo - Earth Lord
 Ng Wai - Earth Mistress
 Ho Fan as Tang Sanzang

See also
 The Cave of the Silken Web (1927 film)

Reference

External links
 IMDb entry
 Hong Kong Cinemagic entry
 Film review with screenshots

Hong Kong adventure comedy films
1967 films
1960s Mandarin-language films
Films based on Journey to the West
Films directed by Ho Meng Hua